Merillat may refer to:

Merillat Airport, Tecumseh, Lenawee County, Michigan, U.S.
Merillat Industries, an American manufacturer of kitchen cabinets

People with the surname
Orville D. Merillat
Richard Merillat